Edgaras Mastianica (born 26 October 1988) is a Lithuanian professional footballer who most recently played for Utenis Utena.

External links

Profile at futbolinis.lt

1988 births
Living people
Lithuanian footballers
Lithuanian expatriate footballers
Expatriate footballers in Belarus
Expatriate footballers in Estonia
FK Žalgiris players
FK Atlantas players
JK Sillamäe Kalev players
FK Klaipėdos Granitas players
FC Dnepr Mogilev players
FK Utenis Utena players
Meistriliiga players
I Lyga players
Association football midfielders
Lithuanian expatriate sportspeople in Belarus
Lithuanian expatriate sportspeople in Estonia